The 1958 Rice Owls football team represented Rice University during the 1958 NCAA University Division football season. The Owls were led by 19th-year head coach Jess Neely and played their home games at Rice Stadium in Houston, Texas. They competed as members of the Southwest Conference, finishing tied for second.

Schedule

References

Rice
Rice Owls football seasons
Rice Owls football